Fiel Domingos Constantino is an Angolan accountant and former minister of commerce.

Career 
Constantino joined the civil service in 1995 as an accountant in the ministry of Finance. He became a member of the Order of Accountants and Experts of Angola in 2015. He previously served as Pedagogical Director of the Medium Institute of Economics of Luanda (Karl Marx Institute). He served as minister of commerce from March 2016 to September 2017.

References 

Angolan politicians
Year of birth missing (living people)
Living people